Dom Punch (born 15 June 1958 in Patrickswell, County Limerick) is a retired Irish sportsperson.  He played hurling with his local club Patrickswell and was a member of the Limerick senior inter-county team in the 1970s and 1980s.

References

1958 births
Living people
Patrickswell hurlers
Limerick inter-county hurlers